Sumol Sumontame (born 17 August 1932) is a Thai former sports shooter. He competed at the 1960 Summer Olympics and the 1964 Summer Olympics.

References

1932 births
Living people
Sumol Sumontame
Sumol Sumontame
Shooters at the 1960 Summer Olympics
Shooters at the 1964 Summer Olympics
Sumol Sumontame
Sumol Sumontame